Vigneswaran is a Tamil male given name. Due to the Tamil tradition of using patronymic surnames, it may also be a surname for males and females.

C. V. Vigneswaran ,Sri Lankan Tamil politician
Vanniasingham Vigneswaran ,Sri Lankan Tamil politician
Vigneswaran Sanasee, Malaysian Tamil politician

Tamil masculine given names